Metsola is a Finnish surname. Notable people with the surname include:

 Ilari Metsola (born 1992), Finnish ice hockey player
 Juha Metsola (born 1989), Finnish ice hockey player
 Jukka-Pekka Metsola (born 1954), Finnish judoka
 Roberta Metsola (born 1979), Maltese politician, President of the European Parliament

See also
 Metsola, Vantaa, a district of the city of Vantaa, Finland

Finnish-language surnames